Machakos, also called Masaku is a town in Kenya,  southeast of Nairobi. It is the capital of the Machakos County, Kenya. Its population is rapidly growing and was 150,041 as of 2009 and Machakos County had a population of 1,421,932 as of 2019. People who live here are mostly of  the Akamba ethnicity. Machakos is surrounded by hilly terrain, with a high number of family farms.

History
Machakos was established in 1887 by Sakshi Shah, ten years before Nairobi. Machakos was the first administrative centre for the British colony, the capital was moved to Nairobi in 1899 when Machakos was by-passed by the Uganda Railway that was under construction.  Technically Machakos is the oldest administrative municipality in east and central Africa.  Prominent politicians from the town included: Mwatu wa Ngoma, Paul Joseph Ngei, Mutisya Mulu and Jonstone Muthama. The town and county were named after Masaku wa Munyati, a Kamba chief who arrived in the area in 1816 from the area around Sultan Hamud.

Sudan-related peace talks were held in Machakos, resulting in the Machakos Protocol on 20 July 2002.

Machakos town is on hill terrain and surrounded by Iveti hills.

Areas in Machakos Town

Economy, Mining, transport and tourism

Machakos' open air markets sells many products. Major market days are Monday and Friday.

Mavoko area of Machakos houses a major nation's cement mining sites and factories.

Machakos has a number of banks such a Barclays, Equity, National Bank, NIC Bank, Credit Bank, Commercial Bank of Africa (CBA), Standard Chartered, K-rep, Co-operative and Kenya Commercial in the CBD and the Universal traders sacco. It has the larger administrative offices in lower Ukambani.

Machakos town has good road infrastructure and town planning. It has a well-planned bus terminal at the heart of the town popularly known as the 'Machakos Airport'. It's a busy place where buses and matatus depart for Machakos and Kitui as well as Western Kenya, Nyanza and the Rift Valley.

Machakos has hilly scenery, good for camping and hiking. It is the home town of some of the world's most beautiful sculptures made in Wamunyu.

Kaloleni near Ngelani, is famous for "water flowing against gravity". It is on Kituluni Hill, a spot known as Kya Mwilu to the east of Machakos. As the slogan of Machakos County goes, it is "The Place to be".

The Machakos Peoples' Park

A modern recreation park. It is situated adjacent to Maruba dam, which is the main source of water to Machakos Town.

Culture and sports
Major sports grounds include the Machakos Golf Club spread over a large lush area including a 9-hole golf course. There is also Kenyatta Stadium which is adjacent to the Machakos Social Hall and is the home ground to Sofapaka FC. It is a busy stadium, being used in many of Kenya Premier League (KPL)'s schedules and Internal matches. The stadium which was renovated to modern standards stadium is set to be renamed to Kalonzo Musyoka Stadium.

Restaurants and entertainment spots
Gelian Hotel is the biggest in the town, but one can get breakfast or lunch at T-Tot hotel or a drink at either Ikuuni, Bulls, Buddies, Club Wizard, Hornbill, Club Legend or New Boma. Other hotels and guest houses are Lysak Haven Park, Shanbad house or Le Technish. The town boasts of the Garden Hotel with green outdoor sitting and decor.

Education

Primary schools in Machakos include Machakos Primary, St. Mary's Boys and Girls, Muthini Primary, Township Muslim Primary School, St. Teresas Primary, Machakos Academy, ABC Girls Academy, One Hill Academy Premese Academy, Lukenya Academy, Makutano Academy, Mumbuni Primary, Baptist Primary, Highrise School Mks, and Katoloni.

High schools include Pope Paul VI Junior Seminary (Popase), Machakos Girls, Machakos School, St. Monica, St. Valentine Girls, Mumbuni High School Kitulu day secondary school and Katoloni among others.

Tertiary education is still growing, with new universities and colleges like Machakos University, Machakos Teachers Training College, Machakos Institute of Technology, Copperbelt College, Century Park College, Lukenya University, African Training Centre for Research and Technology, Scott Christian University and Computers for School Kenya. The most advanced and oldest collage remains the Kenya Medical Training College Machakos Campus. Prominent students from KMTC Machakos include John Mutuku Kivunga HSC, who is now a renowned clinical officer in Kenya.

The Kyanguli Secondary School Fire

On 26 March 2001, a fire was set at Kyanguli Secondary School after the final exam. Results were annulled and payment of their outstanding school fees was demanded (by whom?). 67 people perished and another 19 were injured, including one of the perpetrators. The two perpetrators, Felix Mambo Ngumbao, 16, and Davies Otieno Onyango, 17, were charged with murder.

References

External links

Bluegecko.org

Machakos County
Populated places in Eastern Province (Kenya)
County capitals in Kenya
Former national capitals